Cephalophyllum spissum is a species of succulent in the genus Cephalophyllum. It is endemic to the Western Cape.

Conservation status 
Cephalophyllum spissum is classified as Least Concern.

References

External links 
 

Endemic flora of South Africa
Flora of South Africa
Flora of the Cape Provinces
spissum